Derek Wood may refer to:

 Derek Wood (author) (1930–2003), author of The Narrow Margin and books about aviation
 Derek Wood (British Army soldier), British Army corporal killed by the Provisional Irish Republican Army
 Derek Wood (footballer) (born 1959), Scottish footballer
 Derek Wood (barrister), principal of St Hugh's College, Oxford 1991–2002